Irina Andreyevna Papkova (now Irina du Quenoy), is a scholar of religion and international relations, currently a Research Fellow of Georgetown University's Berkley Center for Religion, Peace, and World Affairs. She is based in Washington, DC and New York.

A magna cum laude graduate of Hamilton College, Papkova received M.A. and Ph.D. degrees from Georgetown University. She has taught there, at George Washington University, and at Central European University. She has also held academic fellowships at the Kennan Institute for Advanced Russian Studies in Washington, the Institut für die Wissenschaften vom Menschen in Vienna, and the Slavic-Eurasian Research Center at Hokkaido University in Japan. Papkova is the author of The Orthodox Church in Russian Politics (Oxford University Press, 2011), a critically acclaimed study of state-church relations in post-Soviet Russia, and numerous scholarly articles in academic journals. She has been a regular contributor to The Revealer, a gazette of religion and international affairs issues, and is actively involved in the world of Russian Orthodox Church music.

Papkova is a daughter of the Very Reverend André Papkov, a Russian Orthodox Archpriest and rector of Chicago's Cathedral of the Holy Protection.  She is a great-great-granddaughter of the Russian-German industrialist, politician, philanthropist, and anti-communist leader Nikolay Fyodorovitch von Ditmar. Another ancestor was the Russian jurist and politician Fyodor Alexandrovich Golovin, a founder of the Constitutional Democratic Party and chairman of the short-lived second convocation of the Imperial Russian Duma. She is a cousin of the Russian-born German stage and screen actress Marina von Ditmar.

She is married to the historian, critic, investor, and philanthropist Paul du Quenoy. Under her married name, she is chairwoman of the Russian Ball of Washington, DC.

References 

Year of birth missing (living people)
Living people
Georgetown University faculty
Hamilton College (New York) alumni
George Washington University faculty
Academic staff of Central European University
Academic staff of Herzen University